Her Man is a 1924 American silent Western film directed by Alan James and starring William Fairbanks and Margaret Landis.

The film is preserved by The Library of Congress.

Cast
 William Fairbanks 
 Margaret Landis
 Tom McGuire
 James Pierce
 Frank Whitson

References

External links
 
 

1924 films
1924 Western (genre) films
American black-and-white films
Films directed by Alan James
Silent American Western (genre) films
1920s American films